Cafe X is a 1928 Norwegian crime film. The film was directed by Walter Fyrst, who also wrote the screenplay and headed the production through his company Fürst-film. It stars Bengt Djurberg and Tove Tellback.

Plot
The film tells the story of journalist Karl Kraft (Djurberg) who uncovers a major weapon smuggling scheme going on in Oslo. Along the way he meets the waitress Lilly (Tellback), who is involved in the affair. He convinces her to abandon the plot, and the two end up together.

References

External links
 

1928 films
1928 crime films
Norwegian silent films
Norwegian black-and-white films
Norwegian crime films